"It's So Easy" is a song composed by Dave Watkins with words by Watkins and Dor Lee and performed by Andy Williams.  The song reached #13 in the UK in 1970 and #19 in Ireland.

References

1970 singles
Andy Williams songs
CBS Records singles